Rafi (also Romanized as Rafī‘) is a city and capital of Neysan District, Hoveyzeh County, Khuzestan Province, Iran.  At the 2006 census, its population was 3,810, in 631 families.

References

Populated places in Hoveyzeh County

Cities in Khuzestan Province